El Heddaf TV is an Algerian sports television channel based in Algiers which is a part of El Heddaf daily newspaper. The channel operating in Europe, Africa and Middle-East.

History
El Heddaf TV was founded on 4 June 2014, it has started to broadcast its programs on 4 June 2014.

Football coverage

References

External links
 elheddaf.com

Arabic-language television stations
Television channels and stations established in 2014
Television stations in Algeria
2014 establishments in Algeria